Johann Tobias Krebs (7 July 1690 – 11 February 1762) was a German organist and composer, today best remembered as the father of Johann Ludwig Krebs, one of Bach's most accomplished pupils.

Krebs was born in Heichelheim and went to school in the nearby Weimar. Nothing is known about his early musical training, but at age 20 Krebs was proficient enough at the keyboard to be invited to become organist at Buttelstedt, another town in the same area. Krebs accepted, but continued his music studies in Weimar, travelling there twice a week to study with Johann Gottfried Walther, and later with Johann Sebastian Bach. In 1721 he was accepted a position at Buttstädt, where he played the organ of Michaeliskirche and taught at the school. Krebs remained in Buttstädt for the rest of his life. He had three sons, and the eldest, Johann Ludwig Krebs, became a well-known composer.

Krebs' surviving works are scarce. A few chorale preludes preserved in manuscripts show a marked fondness for counterpoint. Two of the lesser known pieces from the Bach-Werke-Verzeichnis catalogue may have been composed by Krebs: 
 Chorale prelude Nun komm, der Heiden Heiland, BWV 660b, an arrangement of one of Bach's Leipzig Chorales, Nun komm, der Heiden Heiland, BWV 660
 Trio in C minor, BWV Anh. 46, a contrapuntal trio which bears some similarity to Bach's organ trio sonatas
In addition, the Eight Short Preludes and Fugues, BWV 553–560, once attributed to Bach, are now considered to be the work of either Johann Tobias Krebs, or his eldest son.

References
 McLean, Hugh J. "Krebs. 1. Johann Tobias Krebs". In L. Root, Deane. Grove Music Online. Oxford Music Online. Oxford University Press.

External links

Brief biography

1690 births
1762 deaths
People from Weimarer Land
German Baroque composers
German classical organists
Organists and composers in the North German tradition
German male organists
18th-century keyboardists
18th-century classical composers
German classical composers
German male classical composers
18th-century German composers
18th-century German male musicians
Male classical organists